Sarah Bowen, OAM(born 15 April 1984) is an Australian Paralympic swimmer.  She was born in Geelong with achondroplasia dwarfism. She competed in four events at the 2004 Athens Games and won a gold medal in the Women's 100m Breaststroke SB6 event, for which she received a Medal of the Order of Australia. At the 2008 Beijing Games, she competed in three events and won a silver medal in the Women's 100m Breaststroke SB6 event.

At the IPC Swimming World Championships, she won gold medals in the Women's 100 m Breaststroke SB56 and Women's  Medley Relay (#4 points) in 2002 and silver medal in the Women's 100m Breaststroke SB6 in 2006.

From 2002 to 2008, she was an Australian Institute of Sport paralympic swimming scholarship holder.  She was coached at Geelong City Aquatic Club by Lucky Weerakkody and trained with Daniel Bell.

In 2004, she received the McHugh-Henderson award for her outstanding performances in the sport of swimming. The award is given out annually by the Short Statured People of Australia [SSPA] organisation.

References 

Female Paralympic swimmers of Australia
Swimmers at the 2004 Summer Paralympics
Swimmers at the 2008 Summer Paralympics
Paralympic gold medalists for Australia
Paralympic silver medalists for Australia
Recipients of the Medal of the Order of Australia
1984 births
Living people
Australian Institute of Sport Paralympic swimmers
Sportspeople from Geelong
Swimmers with dwarfism
Medalists at the 2008 Summer Paralympics
Medalists at the 2004 Summer Paralympics
Paralympic medalists in swimming
Australian female breaststroke swimmers
S6-classified Paralympic swimmers
20th-century Australian women
21st-century Australian women